Andrew David Parker, Baron Parker of Minsmere,  (born 8 May 1962) is a British peer and former intelligence officer who served as Director General of MI5 from 2013 to 2020. He has served as Lord Chamberlain of the Household since 1 April 2021, and is a crossbench member of the House of Lords.

Education
Parker was educated at Churchill College, Cambridge, where he studied natural sciences.

Career
Parker joined the Security Service in 1983. He was seconded to HM Customs and Excise as Director Intelligence in 1999 before becoming Director, International Terrorism at the Security Service in February 2005. After leading the Security Service's response to the 7 July 2005 London bombings and the 2006 transatlantic aircraft plot, he became Deputy Director General in 2007.

Parker went on to become Director General of the Service in April 2013. As of 2015, Parker was paid a salary of between £165,000 and £169,999 by the department, making him one of the 328 most highly paid people in the British public sector at that time.

In May 2018, Parker said that Russia is seeking to undermine European democracies with "malign activities". Speaking in Berlin, Parker also condemned Russia for the "reckless" poisoning of the Skripals in Salisbury. Russia has denied involvement in the poisoning of Sergei Skripal and his daughter Yulia. Parker said the Kremlin was taking part in "deliberate, targeted, malign activity intended to undermine our free, open and democratic societies". Parker also warned Islamic State aspires to commit "devastating" and "more complex" attacks in Europe.

In 2019, Parker, writing with Cressida Dick, the Commissioner of the Metropolitan Police, suggested that far-right and far-left terrorism have been identified as key threats to the safety and prosperity of the nation. They warned that while Islamist terrorism remains the largest by scale, they are also “concerned about the growing threat from other forms of violent extremism … covering a spectrum of hate-driven ideologies, including the extreme right and left.”

In December 2020 it was announced that Parker would be created a crossbench life peer in the 2020 Political Peerages. He was created Baron Parker of Minsmere, of Minsmere in the County of Suffolk, on 29 January 2021. The territorial designation reflects his interest in bird watching. He made his maiden speech on 4 March 2021 during a debate on the space industry.

Parker retired from MI5 in April 2020. On 5 February 2021, Buckingham Palace announced that Lord Parker would succeed Earl Peel as Lord Chamberlain on 1 April 2021.

The ceremonial breaking of the Lord Chamberlain’s “wand of office” during the state funeral of Queen Elizabeth II on 19 September 2022 symbolized the formal end of Parker's service as Lord Chamberlain to the monarch before the late Queen was lowered into the Royal Vault for private interment that evening to join her sister, parents (George VI and Elizabeth), and husband. Parker continues to serve as Lord Chamberlain under Charles III.

Personal life
Parker is married and has two children. He is an ornithologist and avid wildlife photographer.

Honours
Parker was appointed Knight Commander of the Order of the Bath (KCB) in the 2019 Birthday Honours. He was appointed as a Knight Grand Cross of the Royal Victorian Order upon appointment as Lord Chamberlain, and was made a member of the Privy Council a few days later.

References

External links
The Lord Chamberlain - Royal Household official website

1962 births
Living people
Alumni of Churchill College, Cambridge
Civil servants in HM Customs and Excise
Crossbench life peers
Directors General of MI5
Knights Commander of the Order of the Bath
Knights Grand Cross of the Royal Victorian Order
Members of the Privy Council of the United Kingdom
Life peers created by Elizabeth II